In geometry, a circular section is a circle on a quadric surface (such as an ellipsoid or hyperboloid). It is a special plane section of the quadric, as this circle is the intersection with the quadric of the plane containing the circle.

Any plane section of a sphere is a circular section, if it contains at least 2 points. Any quadric of revolution contains circles as sections with planes that are orthogonal to its axis; it does not contain any other circles, if it is not a sphere. More hidden are circles on other quadrics, such as tri-axial ellipsoids, elliptic cylinders, etc. Nevertheless, it is true that:
Any quadric surface which contains ellipses contains circles, too.
Equivalently, all quadric surfaces contain circles except parabolic and hyperbolic cylinders and hyperbolic paraboloids.

If a quadric contains a circle, then every intersection of the quadric with a plane parallel to this circle is also a circle, provided it contains at least two points. Except for spheres, the circles contained in a quadric, if any, are all parallel to one of two fixed planes (which are equal in the case of a quadric of revolution).

Circular sections are used in crystallography.

Using projective geometry
The circular sections of a quadric may be computed from the implicit equation of the quadric, as it is done in the following sections. They may also be characterised and studied by using synthetic projective geometry.

Let  be the intersection of a quadric surface  and a plane . Under these hypotheses, the curve  is a circle if and only if its intersection with the plane at infinity is included in the ombilic (the curve at infinity of equation ).

Thus the plane sections of  cannot be circles (neither ellipses).

If  is a sphere, its intersection with the plane at infinity is the ombilic, and all plane sections are circles.

If  is a surface of revolution, its intersection with the ombilic consists of a pair of complex conjugate points (which are double points). A real plane contains these two points if and only if it is perpendicular to the axis of revolution. Thus the circular sections are the plane sections by a plane perpendicular to the axis, that have at least two real points.

As  is a curve of degree two, its intersection with the plane at infinity consists of two points, possibly equal. The curve  is thus a circle, if these two points are one of these two pairs of complex conjugate points on the ombilic. Thus, one has a circular section if and only  has at least two real points and  contains one of these lines at infinity (that is if  is parallel to one of two directions defined by these lines at infinity).

Determination of circular sections of a quadric 
In order to find the planes, which contain circular sections of a given quadric, one uses the following statements:
(S:) If the common points of a quadric with a sphere are contained in a pair of planes, then the intersection curve consists of two circles.
(P:) If the intersection  of a plane and a quadric is a circle, then any parallel plane, that contains at least two points of the quadric, intersects the quadric in a circle, too.

Hence the strategy for the detection of circular sections is: 
1) Find a sphere that intersects the quadric in a pair of planes and 
2) The planes that are parallel to the detected ones deliver the remaining circular sections.

Tri-axial ellipsoid 

For the ellipsoid with equation 

and the semi-axes   one uses an auxiliary sphere with equation 

The sphere's radius has to be chosen such that the intersection with the ellipsoid is contained in two planes through the origin.

This equation describes a pair of planes, if one of the 3 coefficients is zero. Only in case of  one gets a pair of planes  with equation 

because only in this case the remaining coefficients have different signs.

The diagram gives an impression of more common intersections between a sphere and an ellipsoid and highlights the exceptional circular case (blue).

If the values of the semi-axes are approaching, the two pencils of planes (and circles) approach either. For  all the planes are orthogonal to the z-axis (rotation axis).

Proof of property  (P):
Turning the ellipsoid around  the y-axis such that one of the two circles (blue) lies in the x-y-plane results in a new equation of the ellipsoid:

For  one gets , which has to be the equation of a circle. This is only true, if . 
The intersection of the ellipsoid by a plane with equation , (parallel to the x-y-plane) has the equation
.
This equation describes a circle or a point or the empty set. Center and radius of the circle can be found be completing the square.

Elliptical hyperboloid of one sheet

For  the hyperboloid of one sheet with equation 
 
analogously one gets for the intersection with the sphere  the equation

Only for  one gets a pair of planes:

Elliptical cylinder 

For the elliptical cylinder with equation
 
one gets the equation

Only for  one gets a pair of planes:

Elliptical paraboloid 

For the elliptical paraboloid with equation

one chooses a sphere containing the vertex (origin) and with center on the axis (z-axis) :

After elimination of the linear parts one gets the equation

Only for  one gets a pair of planes :

Elliptical hyperboloid of two sheets

The hyperboloid of two sheets with equation 

is shifted at first such that one vertex is the origin (s. diagram):

Analogously to the paraboloid case one chooses a sphere containing the origin with center on the z-axis:

After elimination of the linear parts one gets the equation

Only for   one gets a pair of planes:

Elliptical cone 

The elliptical cone with equation 

is shifted such that the vertex is not the origin (s. diagram):

Now a sphere with center at the origin is suitable:

Eliminatiion of  yields:

In this case completing the square gives:

In order to get the equation of a pair of planes, the right part of the equation has to be zero, which is true for 
The solution for z gives:

References 
H. F. Baker: Principles of Geometry, Volume 3, Cambridge University Press, 2010, .
D. M. Y. Sommerville: Analytical Geometry of Three Dimensions, Cambridge University Press, 1959, p. 204.
K. P. Grotemeyer: Analytische Geometrie. Göschen-Verlag, 1962, p. 143.
H. Scheid, W. Schwarz: Elemente der Linearen Algebra und der Analysis. Spektrum, Heidelberg, 2009, p. 132.

External links 
H. Wiener, P. Treutlein: Models of a tri-axial ellipsoid and an elliptic paraboloid using circular sections (see p. 15)  (PDF).

 

Analytic geometry